Herman Lee Donovan (March 17, 1887 – November 21, 1964) was an American educator and college administrator who served as the fourth president of the University of Kentucky (UK) from 1941 to 1956. During this period, the University of Kentucky faced many challenges including the desegregation of both the graduate and undergraduate divisions, an influx of veterans as a result of the G.I. Bill, and political interference from legislators in Frankfort.

A native of Maysville, Kentucky, on the Ohio River, Donovan was the first student enrolled at the Western Kentucky State Normal School (now Western Kentucky University), graduating in 1908.  He later attended the University of Kentucky, Columbia University, and George Peabody School for Teachers (now Peabody College of Vanderbilt University) in Nashville, Tennessee, from which he earned his Ph.D. At Columbia University, Donovan was firmly schooled in the educational idea of Progressivism, and later he headed Eastern Kentucky Normal School (now called Eastern Kentucky University) from 1928 to 1941 in Richmond, Kentucky, before being called to head UK.

Donovan believed that the state of Kentucky should be UK's campus, and he was fond of saying, "You cannot have a great state without a great state university." He wrote about his experiences as a teacher, builder, and administrator in the memoir Keeping the University Free and Growing, published in 1959. Particularly notable is Donovan's chapter on integration, in which he discusses the case of Lyman Johnson, the Louisville history schoolteacher who won the right to attend the university's graduate school under court order in 1949.

Donovan was married to Nell Stuart and died in 1964. He is buried in Lexington Cemetery, not far from the grave of Coach Adolph Rupp, who won several NCAA championships at UK while Donovan was president.

References
Donovan, Herman Lee. Keeping the University Free and Growing Lexington: University of Kentucky Press, 1959.
Hardin,John A. Fifty Years of Segregation: Black Higher Education in Kentucky, 1904-1954 Lexington: The University Press of Kentucky, 1997.
 Biography at the University of Kentucky

Presidents of the University of Kentucky
Presidents of Eastern Kentucky University
1887 births
1964 deaths
People from Maysville, Kentucky
Columbia University alumni
Western Kentucky University alumni
University of Kentucky alumni
Vanderbilt University alumni